Kalle Järvilehto (born 21 July 1995) is a Finnish snowboarder. He competed in the 2018 Winter Olympics.

References

External links
 
 
 
 

1995 births
Living people
Snowboarders at the 2018 Winter Olympics
Snowboarders at the 2022 Winter Olympics
Finnish male snowboarders
Olympic snowboarders of Finland
Snowboarders at the 2012 Winter Youth Olympics
Sportspeople from Helsinki